Alex Grant (born January 20, 1989) is a Canadian professional ice hockey defenceman. He is currently under contract with Barys Astana in the Kontinental Hockey League (KHL). Grant was selected by the Pittsburgh Penguins in the 4th round (118th overall) of the 2007 NHL Entry Draft.

Playing career
Grant was selected in the first round (first overall) of the 2005 QMJHL Entry Draft by the Saint John Sea Dogs,
and played four seasons of major junior hockey in the Quebec Major Junior Hockey League with Saint John and the Shawinigan Cataractes.

On June 24, 2013, the Pittsburgh Penguins traded Grant to the Anaheim Ducks in exchange for winger Harry Zolnierczyk. He was re-signed to a one-year contract on July 10, 2013.

Grant scored his first goal in his first NHL game, on November 30, 2013, against Antti Niemi of the San Jose Sharks. Despite scoring a goal in his second successive game with the Ducks, on December 12, 2013, he was reassigned to the Norfolk Admirals of the American Hockey League. Approaching the trade deadline on March 5, 2014, Grant was traded by the Ducks to the Ottawa Senators in exchange for minor league right winger Andre Petersson.

On July 2, 2015, Grant signed a one-year, two-way contract as a free agent with the Arizona Coyotes.

On July 4, 2016, Grant signed a one-year, two-way deal as a free agent with the Boston Bruins. He spent the entire 2016–17 season in the AHL with affiliate, the Providence Bruins, first among the league's defensemen in scoring with 49 points in 70 games and second in goals scored with 17.

On July 1, 2017, Grant left the Bruins as a free agent to sign his third successive one-year, two-way contract with the Minnesota Wild. Grant was assigned to the Wild's AHL affiliate, the Iowa Wild for the duration of the 2017–18 season. In 73 games, he collected 13 goals and 36 points.

Grant signed a one-year contract with Finnish club, Jokerit of the Kontinental Hockey League on June 15, 2018.

After four seasons with Jokerit, Grant left the club after their withdrawal from the KHL due to the Russian invasion of Ukraine. As a free agent into the off-season, Grant opted to continue his tenure in the KHL, signing a one-year deal with Russian club, SKA Saint Petersburg, on July 1, 2022. In the 2022–23 season, Grant made just 16 appearances on the blueline with SKA before he was traded to Kazakhstani based club, Barys Astana, on November 22, 2022.

International play
In January 2022, Grant was selected to play for Team Canada at the 2022 Winter Olympics.

Career statistics

Regular season and playoffs

International

References

External links

1989 births
Living people
Anaheim Ducks players
Arizona Coyotes players
Barys Nur-Sultan players
Binghamton Senators players
Canadian ice hockey defencemen
Canadian expatriate ice hockey players in Finland
Ice hockey people from Nova Scotia
Iowa Wild players
Jokerit players
Norfolk Admirals players
Ice hockey players at the 2022 Winter Olympics
Olympic ice hockey players of Canada
People from Antigonish, Nova Scotia
Pittsburgh Penguins draft picks
Providence Bruins players
Saint John Sea Dogs players
Shawinigan Cataractes players
SKA Saint Petersburg players
Springfield Falcons players
Wheeling Nailers players
Wilkes-Barre/Scranton Penguins players